The 1999 All-Big 12 Conference football team consists of American football players chosen as All-Big 12 Conference players for the 1999 NCAA Division I-A football season.  The conference recognizes two official All-Big 12 selectors: (1) the Big 12 conference coaches selected separate offensive and defensive units and named first- and second-team players (the "Coaches" team); and (2) a panel of sports writers and broadcasters covering the Big 12 also selected offensive and defensive units and named first- and second-team players (the "Media" team).

Offensive selections

Quarterbacks
 Major Applewhite, Texas (Coaches-1 (tie); Media-1)
 Eric Crouch, Nebraska (Coaches-1 (tie); Media-2)
 Josh Heupel, Oklahoma (Coaches-2)

Running backs
 Darren Davis, Iowa State (Coaches-1; Media-1)
 Hodges Mitchell, Texas (Coaches-1; Media-1)
 Sammy Morris, Texas Tech (Coaches-2)
 Cortlen Johnson, Colorado (Coaches-2)

Centers
 Rob Riti, Missouri (Coaches-1; Media-1)
 Dominic Raiola, Nebraska (Coaches-1)

Guards

Tackles
 Ryan Johanningmeier, Colorado (Coaches-1)

Tight ends
 Tracey Wistrom, Nebraska (Coaches-1; Media-1)
 Marcellus Rivers, Oklahoma State (Coaches-2)

Receivers
 Quincy Morgan, Kansas State (Coaches-1; Media-1)
 Kwame Cavil, Texas (Coaches-1; Media-1)

Defensive selections

Defensive linemen
 Darren Howard, Kansas State (Coaches-1; Media-1)
 Justin Smith, Missouri (Coaches-1; Media-1)
 Steve Warren, Nebraska (Coaches-1; Media-1)
 Casey Hampton, Texas (Coaches-1; Media-1)
 Shaun Rogers, Texas (Coaches-1)
 Aaron Humphrey, Texas (Coaches-2)
 Taurus Rucker, Texas Tech (Coaches-2)
 Justin Bannan, Colorado (Coaches-2)
 Mario Fatafehi, Kansas State (Coaches-2)
 Kris Kocurek, Texas Tech (Coaches-2)

Linebackers
 Carlos Polk, Nebraska (Coaches-1; Media-1)
 Mark Simoneau, Kansas State (Coaches-1; Media-1)
 Rocky Calmus, Oklahoma (Coaches-2; Media-1)
 Jashon Sykes, Colorado (Coaches-2; Media-1)

Defensive backs
 Mike Brown, Nebraska (Coaches-1; Media-1)
 Ralph Brown, Nebraska (Coaches-1; Media-1)
 Lamar Chapman, Kansas State (Coaches-1; Media-1)
 Carl Nesmith, Kansas (Coaches-1)
 Ben Kelly, Colorado (Media-1)
 Damen Wheeler, Colorado (Coaches-2)
 Jarrod Cooper, Kansas State (Coaches-2)
 Jason Webster, Texas A&M (Coaches-2)
 Kevin Curtis, Texas Tech (Coaches-2)

Special teams

Kickers
 Jamie Rheem, Kansas State (Coaches-1; Media-1)
 Kris Stockton, Texas (Coaches-2)

Punters
 Shane Lechler, Texas A&M (Coaches-1; Media-1)
 Dan Hadenfeldt, Nebraska (Coaches-2)

All-purpose / Return specialists
 David Allen, Kansas State (Coaches-1; Media-1)
 Ben Kelly, Colorado (Coaches-1)
 Bobby Newcombe, Nebraska (Coaches-2)
 Brandon Daniels, Oklahoma (Coaches-2)

Key
Bold = selected as a first-team player by both the coaches and media panel

Coaches = selected by Big 12 Conference coaches

Media = selected by a media panel

See also
1999 College Football All-America Team

References

All-Big 12 Conference
All-Big 12 Conference football teams